Elisa Amanda Giustinianovich Campos (born 23 November 1984) is a Chilean politician, political activist and scholar who is a member of the Chilean Constitutional Convention.

She was the first constituent to resign from The List of the People.

References

External links
 LinkedIn Profile

1984 births
Living people
Chilean people
University of Concepción alumni
21st-century Chilean politicians
Members of the List of the People
Members of the Chilean Constitutional Convention
Chilean people of Croatian descent